Dagwood may refer to:
 Dagwood Bumstead, a character in the comic strip Blondie
 Dagwood sandwich, any of various extremely tall sandwiches built by the character
 Dagwood dog, a corndog 
 Dagwood (seaQuest DSV), TV character